Arceuthobium oxycedri, juniper dwarf mistletoe, is a hemiparasite of the family Santalaceae. It parasitizes members of the genus Juniperus, especially Juniperus oxycedrus and Juniperus communis.

Description

The juniper mistletoe is small in size averaging between 2 and 15 cm. This dioecious plant has a very small stem and the leaves consist of small sheets with sessile flowers. It is distributed throughout much of Europe, Asia and parts of northern Africa.

Taxonomy

Arceuthobium oxycedri was described by Friedrich August von Marschall Bieberstein and published in Flora Tauric-Caucasica 3: 629, in 1819.

Synonyms
 Arceuthobium juniperi Bubani
 Razoumofskya oxycedri ( DC. ) FWSchultz ex Nyman
 Caucasica Razoumowskia sloth. former M.Bieb.
 Razoumowskia oxycedri (DC.) FWSchultz
 Viscum caucasicum Steud.
 Viscum oxycedri DC.

References

oxycedri
Parasitic plants
Epiphytes
Flora of Lebanon
Flora of Iran